The 1997–98 season was Clydebank's thirty-second season in the Scottish Football League. They competed in the Scottish Second Division where they finished 2nd and promoted back to the Scottish First Division. They also competed in the Scottish League Cup, Scottish Challenge Cup and Scottish Cup.

Results

Division 2

Final League table

Scottish League Cup

Scottish Challenge Cup

Scottish Cup

References

Clydebank
Clydebank F.C. (1965) seasons